Havenhouse railway station is situated  south-west of Skegness in Lincolnshire, England.  The station was originally called 'Croft Bank'. There was formerly a Seacroft railway station between Havenhouse and Skegness, but it is now closed.

The station is now owned by Network Rail and managed by East Midlands Railway who provide all rail services.  In 2018/19 it was the least used station in Lincolnshire and in the East Midlands and the fifth least used station in Great Britain.

The station is unstaffed and offers limited facilities other than two shelters, bicycle storage, timetables and modern 'Help Points'. The full range of tickets for travel are purchased from the guard on the train at no extra cost; there are no retail facilities at this station.

Services
All services at Havenhouse are operated by East Midlands Railway.

There is no Sunday service at the station, although a normal service operates on most Bank Holidays.

References

External links

Railway stations in Lincolnshire
DfT Category F2 stations
Former Great Northern Railway stations
Railway stations in Great Britain opened in 1873
Railway stations served by East Midlands Railway
Low usage railway stations in the United Kingdom